Verdial is a surname. Notable people with the surname include:

Bertolomeu Verdial (born 1989), East Timorese footballer
Mario Verdial (1962–2015), Honduran businessman